Hadleigh William Parkes (born 5 October 1987) is a New Zealand-born Welsh international rugby union player, whose favoured position is at the centre. He currently plays for the Black Rams Tokyo  in the Japan Rugby League One. Parkes also has a successful BBC sport rugby union column.

Club career

Super Rugby

He also played in both 2013 Super Rugby promotion/relegation matches, failing to help the Kings retain their Super Rugby status.

He made his first of two appearances in the South African domestic Currie Cup competition in the opening fixture of the 

He returned to New Zealand after the Super Rugby promotion/relegation matches to captain  in the 2013 ITM Cup.

Scarlets
After the end of the 2014 ITM Cup season, Parkes moved to the Scarlets, one of the four professional Welsh regional teams. He was reunited with former Auckland head coach Wayne Pivac at the West Wales region.

Parkes made his debut off the bench in a European Rugby Champions Cup match against Ulster. His first start came two weeks later in the West Wales derby against the Ospreys. Parkes scored his first Scarlets try against Munster, and he was also awarded man of the match for his performance in that game. Then in 2016/2017 season he and the scarlets won the Pro14 title with a win over Munster. That earned him a permanent place at centre for the Scarlets.

His good form at the start of the 2017/2018 season earned him his first Wales cap under the 3-year residence rule. He player a huge part in Scarlets coming 1st in the Pro14 and reaching the final losing to Leinster who they also lost to in the champions cup semi finals which Leinster won. Despite Wales having big success in 2018/2019, the Scarlets struggled and came 4th missing out on a Pro14 play off spots and missing out on the champions cup for the first time in years. Scarlets coach Wayne Pivac departed for Wales with fellow New Zealander Brad Mooar coming in but Parkes and his fellow Wales teammates have not played much of the 2019/2020 because of 2019 World Cup and 2020 Six Nations.

In April 2020, Parkes left the Scarlets to join Japanese team Panasonic Wild Knights, which would end his Wales and Scarlets career.

International career

Wales
Parkes was selected in the Wales national team for the 2017 Autumn International fixtures and made his debut in the final match against South Africa on 2 December 2017, after he became eligible under the three years residence criteria; he played at inside centre and was named man of the match after scoring two tries. His form in the Autumn Internationals and for Scarlets saw him selected to start against Scotland, England, Ireland and Italy in the 2018 Six Nations Championship, scoring a try and earning the man of the match award against Italy. On Saturday 16 March 2019 he scored Wales's only try in the second minute of their 25-7 Grand Slam victory over Ireland in Cardiff, courtesy of a crafty chip over the Irish defence from fly-half and fellow New Zealander Gareth Anscombe.

In 2019 he was called up for Wales for the 2019 Rugby World Cup squad where a he scored a try v Australia. Parkes played in 6 of the 7 games at the World Cup with Wales coming 4th, losing to eventual winners South Africa in the semi finals.

International tries

References

1987 births
New Zealand rugby union players
Welsh rugby union players
Wales international rugby union players
British people of Oceanian descent
Blues (Super Rugby) players
Auckland rugby union players
Manawatu rugby union players
Rugby union fullbacks
Rugby union centres
Eastern Province Elephants players
Southern Kings players
Hurricanes (rugby union) players
Scarlets players
New Zealand expatriate rugby union players
Expatriate rugby union players in South Africa
Expatriate rugby union players in Wales
New Zealand expatriate sportspeople in South Africa
New Zealand expatriate sportspeople in Wales
People educated at Palmerston North Boys' High School
Living people
Saitama Wild Knights players
Black Rams Tokyo players